Sărmașu is a town in Mureș County, central Transylvania, Romania.

Governance
The town administers seven villages: Balda (Báld), Larga (Lárga), Moruț (Marocháza), Sărmășel (Kissármás), Sărmășel-Gară (Bánffytanya), Titiana (Titiána) and Vișinelu (Csehtelke).

Demographics

According to the 2011 census, the town has 6,833 inhabitants, divided among the following ethnic groups: 
Romanians (67.24%)
Hungarians (22.36%)
Roma (10.2%)

Natives
 Alin Chibulcutean (born 1978), football player 
 Anton Doboș (born 1965), football player
 Ovidiu Iuliu Moldovan (1942–2008), actor

See also
 Sărmașu massacre
 Mureș County
 List of Hungarian exonyms (Mureș County)

Notes 

Populated places in Mureș County
Localities in Transylvania
Towns in Romania